The Thames and Medway Canal is a disused canal in Kent, south east England, also known as the Gravesend and Rochester Canal. The canal was first mooted in 1778 as a shortcut for military craft from Deptford and Woolwich Dockyards on the Thames to Chatham Dockyard on the Medway, avoiding the  journey round the peninsula and through the Thames estuary. The canal was also intended to take commercial traffic between the two rivers.

Construction

The first practical attempt to build the canal began in 1799, when Ralph Dodd published a pamphlet and began to solicit investment for the scheme. Dodd's plan was for a  canal with locks and basins, taking two years to build and costing £24,576, part of the cost to be defrayed by selling the excavated chalk as agricultural lime. Dodd was confident that the canal would be useful to the government but would also attract commercial vessels.

In 1800 the canal company received the necessary Act of Parliament and work began at the Gravesend end. The estimated cost had now risen to £57,433.

From the Gravesend basin, the canal began with a straight section aligned with New Tavern Fort, Gravesend. By 1801 it ran  to Higham. A new engineer, Ralph Walker, arrived and announced that the whole canal would cost significantly more than the revised estimate. Work halted, and by 1804 Dodd had probably left the project. Over the next few years, Walker suggested two new routes for the Higham to Strood stretch, for which Acts of Parliament were obtained and money raised. His second route was decided on but required a tunnel through the chalk hills; work on this did not start until 1819. The canal finally opened on 14 October 1824, by which time the Napoleonic wars were long over and the military need had greatly diminished. The canal had taken five Acts of Parliament and cost some £260,000.

Operating problems

It was intended that the canal would be used for the transport of hops and other locally grown produce, but it was not a commercial success. It had locks at each end to protect the water level from tidal change, but the canal walls leaked and the water level dropped between every spring tide. A steam-driven pumping station was built  to rectify this. 

Complaints then came from barge-owners that the tunnel was slow to use, so in 1830 it was shut for two months while an open-air passing place was dug in the middle. This 100-yard long cutting divided the tunnel into a separate Higham tunnel and Strood tunnel. The canal tolls reflected these improvements, but if a boat missed the tide it would have to wait in the canal basin for longer than the journey round Hoo would have taken.

Higham and Strood tunnel
These dimensions could accommodate a 60 tonne sailing barge with its mast lowered.

The tunnel was dug through the chalk using only hand tools, but occasionally gunpowder was used. Several workmen were killed in rockfalls. It was considered an engineering wonder of its time.

The tunnel is so perfectly straight, that a person placed at one end, may discern a small light entering at the other extremity [...] On the opening of the tunnel, a small steam passage boat was employed for the conveyance of passengers from Gravesend to Rochester, and vice versa; but as it was found to injure the towing-path of the tunnel, as well as the banks of the canal, it was discontinued. Foot passengers, however, still pass to and fro, though some caution is necessary, to avoid coming into contact with the horse, or horses, towing the barges.
—Tallis Directory
 1839

Sharing with the railway

From 1845 the newly built railway between Gravesend and Strood shared the tunnel with the canal, a single track resting partially on the towpath and partially on wooden stakes in the water.

The ride through the dreary tunnel with the dark waters of the canal beneath us, and an insecure chalk roof above our heads, enlivened as it is by occasional shrieks from the engine's vaporous lungs, and the unceasing rattle of the train, is apt to make one feel somewhat nervous; and the first glimpse of bright daylight that breaks upon us, relieves us from a natural anxiety as to the chances we run of being crushed by the fall of some twenty tons of chalk from above, or being precipitated into twenty feet of water beneath, with the doors of the carriages locked and no "Nautilus belt" around our waists and not even a child's caul in our pocket. This relief is however temporary, for the light only breaks in through a gap in the tunnel, and some more experienced traveller informs us we are only half out of it. However, our journey is brought to a close without any accident: and we embark on the steamer that is to deposit us at Chatham. 
—William Orr, 1847

In 1846 the canal company sold the tunnel to the South Eastern Railway company, which filled the canal and laid a double railway track over it. This was part of the North Kent Line. The canal towing contractor's home was converted into the ticket office for Higham railway station.

Orr's fears of a chalk fall, however, were not unfounded. Over the years, there have been many roof falls, most small. But in December 1999 a fall near Strood derailed a train, fortunately without causing serious injuries (but leaving a hole in the ground in an orchard). Some 60% of the tunnel had by this date been lined: in 2004 it was closed to line the remainder and renew the track, reopening a year later on 17 January 2005.

1846 to today

The remainder of the canal, between Higham and Gravesend, continued to be used until 1934. It suffered bomb damage during World War II, and some areas have been back-filled or are choked with reed growth. The Strood canal basin, long orphaned by the loss of the tunnel, was back-filled in 1986 and has now been built over.

Since 1976 the canal has been in the hands of the Thames & Medway Canal Association (TMCA), which has dredged some areas. British Rail restored one of the swing bridges. The towpath has recently been renovated for use by pedestrians and cyclists. It now forms part of Route 1 of the National Cycle Network from Dover to John o' Groats. For walkers, it forms part of circular walks linked to the Saxon Shore Way.

There are now plans to fully renovate the canal and make it a focal point of development in Gravesend, to benefit the town while meeting the Thames Gateway project's demands for housebuilding. In October 2004, the Gravesend canal basin was dredged, after which the lock gates into the Thames were renovated, enabling the basin to be used by boats from the river. The line of the canal has been protected from development since 1992.

Notes and references

 Priestley, Joseph (1831). Historical account of the navigable rivers, canals and railways throughout Great Britain. 1st ed Longman;Nichols. 2nd ed Cass, 1967. This author (b.1739) is not Joseph Priestley the chemist.
 Thames and Medway Canal Association History of the canal
 

 Rayner, Stephen. Memories page, Medway News (used with permission).

Further reading
 
 March, Edgar (1948). Spritsail Barges of the Thames & Medway. David & Charles, 1970.

See also

Canals of the United Kingdom
History of the British canal system

External links
 Thames and Medway Canal Association - currently restoring sections of the canal.
 Victorian Web Pencil drawing of Higham tunnel entrance, 1889
 Multimap Map of canal from Gravesend to Lower Higham. Strood canal basin was in crook of River Medway above word "Rochester" on map.
 Sustrans Official site of the national cycle network.
 

Canals in Kent
Transport in Medway
Gravesham
CThamesandMedway
Canals opened in 1824